Alexander Sarantos Tremulis (January 23, 1914 – December 29, 1991) was a Greek-American industrial designer in the North American automotive industry. Tremulis held automotive design positions at Cord Automobile, Duesenberg, General Motors, Tucker Car Corporation and Ford Motor Company before establishing a consulting firm.

Early career
Tremulis was the son of Greek immigrants.  His parents were Antonia and Sarantos Tremulis, who came from a village near Sparta. As a 19-year-old and without any formal training in art or engineering, he landed a job on the design team for the Auburn-Cord-Duesenberg Company in 1933.  Among his projects were the now famous and classic Cord 810 and 812 series, as well as a custom Duesenberg roadster having both convertible and hardtop options. In 1936, he was named Chief Stylist for Auburn-Cord-Duesenberg, and remained in that role until the company failed in 1937.

Tremulis briefly worked for General Motors before moving to Briggs-Le Baron, a custom coachbuilder for Chrysler at the time. In 1938 he worked for Custom Motors in Beverly Hills, California, that made unique cars for movie stars. He was also a consultant for Crosley and American Bantam in 1939. His designs for American Bantam remained in production until the firm switched over completely to the production of military Jeeps prior to World War II. Returning to Briggs in 1939, he worked with Werner Gubitz and Howard "Dutch" Darrin to design the production versions of the Packard Clipper. He was also the creative source for the 1941 Chrysler "Thunderbolt" concept car. His contributions to these two models helped establish styling trends that would influence automobile designs after World War II.

Air Corps concepts
After Pearl Harbor was bombed in 1941, Tremulis joined the United States Army Air Forces. He worked on advanced aircraft concepts at Wright Field (now Wright-Patterson Air Force Base), and developed a concept, which in the 1960s became known as the Boeing Dyna-Soar, a gliding re-entry space vehicle. While at the Air Corps, he made the first speculative drawings of what extraterrestrial life forms would use as transportation to visit the Earth. His concept drawings were the first saucer shaped spacecraft drawings documented.

Later career
After the War, Tremulis worked with the design firm of Tammen & Denison until Preston Tucker hired him to design the 1948 Tucker Sedan. As Phil Egan described in his book, "Design and Destiny: The Making of the Tucker Automobile", it was Tremulis who was primarily responsible for guiding the fabrication of the "Tin Goose" to conclusion.  The first production Tucker automobiles were powered by a converted Franklin helicopter engine supplied by Air Cooled Motors.  Carl Doman, an engineer with Air Cooled, built a higher horsepower engine, 275 horsepower vs 166 horsepower, but was voted down by management who felt the car was fast enough with the stock powerplant.  The higher horsepower engine was to be put on the shelf for a future model called the Talisman, of which both Alex Tremulis and his assistant, Phil Egan, would eventually draw up proposals for. Those designs never came to fruition.

In 1957, as a Ford employee, Tremulis was assigned the task of designing the car that "he believed we would be driving in the year 2000". Tremulis drew up plans and made a clay model of the Ford X-2000, a concept that would later be brought to life in the form of a working prototype in 1999 by UK customiser Andy Saunders, who showed it at car shows in 1999 and 2000. Tremulis also designed the 1962 Ford Seattle-ite XXI concept car for the Seattle World's Fair.

Tremulis left Ford in 1963 to found his own consulting firm in Ann Arbor, Michigan. Among Tremulis' last designs were the 1978 to 1987 Subaru BRAT.

Tremulis served as a consultant for the 1988 film Tucker: The Man and His Dream in which he was played by Elias Koteas. He was also a frequent contributor to "Road & Track" magazine.

Death
Tremulis died on December 29, 1991. He was buried at Ivy Lawn Memorial Park in Ventura, California.

Awards
 1982 — Inducted into the Automobile Hall of Fame.
 1987 — Honored by the Society of Automotive Engineers for the design of the Tucker, as one of the "significant automobiles of the past half century."

See also
 Ford Gyron

References

External links
 Alexander Sarantos Tremulis at Findagrave

1914 births
1991 deaths
American automobile designers
Packard people
Ford designers
United States Army personnel of World War II
American people of Greek descent
People from Ventura, California
People in the automobile industry
United States Army Air Forces soldiers
Burials at Ivy Lawn Cemetery